The Rolex Yacht-Master is a luxury sports watch manufactured by Rolex and first introduced in 1992 as Reference 16628 in 18-karat yellow gold. In 1994, Rolex released a lady's model (69628) and a mid-size model (68628) at 35mm, marking the first time in Rolex history that a professional series watch was available in smaller than the standard size case.  In 1996, Rolex introduced two-tone (stainless steel and 18-carat yellow gold) to the lady's and mid-size line.

In 1997, Rolex released a Yacht-Master made of stainless steel and platinum, wherein the bezel and dial are made from 950 platinum while the case, bracelet and crown, are in stainless steel.

However, by 1999 Rolex had discontinued their two-tone stainless steel and 18K gold reference 68623 and replaced it in 2000 with a new two-tone model: Reference 168623.  The difference between the two models being the new movement found in reference 168623, and the new solid 18K gold center links found on the new, heavier bracelet (the reference 68623 bracelet having hollow center links.)

In 2007, the brand released the Rolex Yacht-Master II regatta chronograph watch, the world's first watch equipped with a programmable countdown from 1 to 10 minutes using a mechanical memory.

In 2015, Rolex launched the 18K Everose gold Yacht-Master, the first Rolex watch to come on a rubberized bracelet, known now as the Oysterflex. The Everose Yacht-Master is available in two sizes - 37mm (268655) and 40mm (126655).

In 2019, Rolex introduced the Rolex Yacht-Master 42, the first Yacht-Master with 42mm case size to feature a date complication.  The case, bezel, and Oysterlock clasp are made of 18K white gold, while the bezel contains a matte black and polished Cerachrom material insert.

As of 2021 the Rolex Yacht-Master is still offered in 37mm, 40mm and 42mm case sizes.

Related pages 

 Rolex Daytona
 Rolex Day-Date
 Rolex Datejust
 Rolex GMT Master II
 Rolex Milgauss
 Rolex Sea Dweller
 Rolex Submariner
 Rolex Yacht-Master II

References

Rolex watches

Products introduced in 1992